Hurricane Luis was a long lived and powerful Category 4 hurricane. It was the strongest hurricane to make landfall and the third-most intense hurricane recorded during the 1995 Atlantic hurricane season. The storm, along with Humberto, Iris, and Karen, was one of four simultaneous tropical systems in the Atlantic basin.

Luis caused very extensive damage to Antigua, St. Barthelemy, the island of St. Martin and Anguilla as it affected Bermuda. The storm accounted for 19 confirmed deaths, left nearly 20,000 homeless (mostly in Anguilla, Barbuda, and St. Martin), and affected more than 70,000 people. Total damage was estimated at $3.3 billion (1995 USD) across the affected areas.

Earlier Category 4 storms that impacted the Leeward Islands in the 20th century include Hurricane Dog in 1950, Hurricane Donna in 1960, Hurricane David in 1979, and Hurricane Hugo in 1989. Luis was the second of three tropical cyclones to affect Guadeloupe in a short period; Hurricane Iris had hit a week before, and Hurricane Marilyn only 10 days after. After Hurricane Luis, the Leeward Islands were struck the following years by numerous hurricanes : Hurricane Bertha and Hortense in 1996, Erika in 1997, Georges in 1998, Jose and Lenny in 1999, and Debby in 2000.

The system formed from a tropical wave, south of Cape Verde islands west of Africa, on August 27, and attained tropical storm status on August 29. The storm reached hurricane status on August 31 and later developed into a  Category 4 hurricane. Luis affected the Leeward Islands at this strength from September 4 to September 6. By the time Luis made landfall on Newfoundland, it had weakened down to a Category 1 hurricane and then became extratropical on September 11.

Meteorological history

On August 26, 1995, an area of disturbed weather associated with a tropical wave emerged over the eastern Atlantic Ocean, between the western coast of Africa and the Cape Verde Islands. A low-level circulation center formed and moved westward until it developed a weak surface low on August 27, and at around 1200 UTC on August 27, the National Hurricane Center (NHC) designated the system as Tropical Depression Thirteen. 36 hours later, on August 29, the NHC upgraded the system to Tropical Storm Luis. Although convective activity fluctuated over the next two days as the result of a nearby wind shear, the storm continued to intensify as pressure rose. When the wind shear relented, an eye began to form, and the system attained hurricane status on August 31. It was classified as a Category 3 major hurricane 18 hours later.

As it tracked north-northwestward, Hurricane Luis continued to strengthen, and became a Category 4 hurricane on the Saffir–Simpson scale on September 2. As it turned further westward, the cyclone maintained a rectilinear slow motion, and the intensity was confirmed by a reconnaissance flight on September 3. The storm began to accelerate slightly as it moved along a subtropical ridge, due to the absorption of Tropical Storm Karen by the stronger Iris.

On the morning of September 5, the islands of Dominica and Guadeloupe, which experienced hurricane-force winds on the northeastern coast of Grande-Terre and La Désirade, had been relatively spared by the storm. The eyewall of the hurricane, however, skimmed Antigua and directly passed over Barbuda as it slowly weakened. During this time, the storm proceeded slowly northwestward, causing moderate damage to Montserrat, Saint Kitts and Nevis, Sint Eustatius, and Saba.

On September 9, the center of the storm passed  to the west of Bermuda, causing minor damage. Later that day, the storm began to accelerate as it traveled northeast, ahead of a strong trough located to the northwest of Luis. On the afternoon of September 10, Luis began to undergo an extratropical transition as it rapidly approached the Canadian coastline. Due to the rapid movement of the storm, significant weakening did not occur until Luis was at an unusually high latitude.

Luis maintained this intensity until September 11, when it reached the Avalon Peninsula in eastern Newfoundland, where cold, dry air became entrenched in its circulation, and the system began to merge with the approaching trough. The NHC issued their final advisory on Hurricane Luis at 0900 UTC on September 11, 1995. The extratropical remains persisted for 30 more hours over the North Atlantic Ocean before being absorbed by the trough near the southern coast of Greenland late on September 12.

Preparations

Three days before passing over the northern Lesser Antilles, Luis became a Category 4 hurricane and was forecasted to avoid areas well to the north, following the path set by Humberto and Karen. However, as Karen neared Iris, it was weakened and absorbed by the stronger storm. This, and the nearby subtropical ridge, ended up steering Luis to the west.

Caribbean
Due to its slow motion, Luis allowed local officials ample time to prepare. Before the storm's arrival, a total of 17 tropical cyclone watches and warnings were declared in several areas throughout the Caribbean. Over the course of September 3, Antigua, Barbuda, Nevis, St. Kitts, St. Martin, Saba, St. Eustatius, Dominica, Guadeloupe, and St. Barthelemy were placed under hurricane watch. At 0000 UTC on September 4, this was upgraded to a hurricane warning for the region from Antigua to St. Martin, and a tropical storm warning for Dominica and Guadeloupe. Six hours later, the British and United States Virgin Islands, as well as Puerto Rico, were placed under hurricane watch. By 2100 UTC, those regions had been upgraded to warning, as well as St. Barthelemy, St. Martin, and Dominica, with Saint Lucia and Martinique under a tropical storm warning.

At 1200 UTC on September 5, the tropical storm warning for St. Lucia was discontinued, and nine hours later, Dominica was downgraded to a tropical storm warning. Throughout September 6-8, all warnings were either downgraded or discontinued. Bermuda was placed under tropical storm watch at 2100 UTC on September 7. This watch was upgraded to a warning at 1500 UTC the next day, and discontinued at 0900 UTC on the 10th.

Canada
The Canadian Hurricane Centre began issuing advisories on the morning of September 8, about 48 hours before Luis' entry into the center's coverage area, as the storm's trajectory began to curve east of Florida. The Maritimes center of the Meteorological Service of Canada issued warnings for the affected areas as early as September 9, 36 hours before the arrival of the storm.

Impact

Leeward Islands
Overall, the powerful winds and heavy rainfall caused by Luis caused extensive crop and property damage across the Leeward Islands. Due to a lack of reports from some affected areas, the exact amount of damage caused by the storm is unknown, but it is estimated at about $3 billion USD.

Antigua and Barbuda
According to Prime Minister Lester Bird, most houses were damaged or eradicated at 70% in Barbuda, and nearly 45% of the residences on Antigua were damaged or destroyed by the hurricane as it passed near  to the north of the island. Across the islands, numerous inhabitants experienced power outages and disrupted water systems. The storm ultimately accounted for three deaths, and injured 165 locals. 32,000 inhabitants on both islands were greatly affected, with 1,700 forced to take shelter, and approximately 3,000 left homeless. Throughout the country, the total damage from the storm was estimated at $350 million, or 60% of the country's Gross Domestic Product (GDP), with most of the damage on Barbuda.

Guadeloupe
Hurricane-force conditions resulted in moderate damage to homes and roofs, uprooted trees, and severe beach erosion. The Basse-Terre region, meanwhile, received minor damage, except to banana crops that were damaged at nearly 90%, and sugar cane crops on the north at nearly 20%. The highest rainfall within the 48-hour period was in La Grande Soufrière, where  of rain damaged the west coast roads and washed away houses.

The storm claimed the life of a 19-year-old French tourist, who had been dragged away by vigorous waves on a pier in eastern Saint-François. The total damage was estimated at 250 million francs ($50 million USD), mostly for the crops and roads.

Saint Barthélemy
This difference in measurement may be due to local effects produced by mountainous terrain on the island and the aircraft sampling winds at a level above the region of maximum winds.

St. Martin

French Collectivity

In Grand Case Bay, rough sea conditions and strong winds were responsible for the damage or destruction of 90% of homes. Other towns, such as the French Quarter and Marigot, also reported extensive damage to homes and vegetation. At least 50% of houses in the Collectivity of Saint Martin were damaged, leaving between 950 to 2,000 residents homeless.

One person was reported dead, and, due to lack of insurances, the preliminary cost of Luis on the French Collectivity was 2 billion francs (€300 million euro, or $350 million USD) worth of damage.

Sint Maarten
The southern part of the island, the Dutch-owned Sint Maarten, received more catastrophic damage than the northern French end. The strongest winds came onshore on the Dutch side, and the capital city of Philipsburg was at least 70% decimated by the storm. Flooding from Luis affected the Great Salt Pond, which deluged several streets.

Of the 70% of residences that were damaged in the storm, nearly 15% became uninhabitable, including businesses, churches, the main airport terminal, some schools, and four hotels. Over 5,000 Haitians living in the Dutch quarter were left homeless, while some towns on the island spent nearly three months without water and power. Of the 1,500 boats sheltered in Simpson Bay Lagoon, nearly 1,300—or 85%—were sunken or run aground. The official death toll in Sint Maarten was eight, with the possibility of more deaths by drowning in the lagoon.

Total damages on the Dutch side were catastrophic, totaling around $1.8 billion USD, and Luis was the most devastating hurricane to hit the islands since Hurricane Donna in 1960.

Anguilla
The eye of the hurricane passed over the northeastern tip of Anguilla. Although its geographic placement means that the island likely would have sustained worse damage than St. Martin, the total scale of damage is still unknown. Luis was the worst hurricane the island suffered since Hurricane Donna in 1960.

St. Kitts and Nevis
The storm further damaged local vegetation and some of the road infrastructure, with problems essentially arising from the poor water system on the islands. Total damage ultimately reached $197 million.

Dominica
Tropical storm-force winds of roughly  affected Dominica from the morning to afternoon of September 5. While overall damages were fairly minor, beach erosion was common, and Luis disrupted several beach hotels and coastal roads. Rough waves on the northeastern and western coast affected towns such as Marigot, Roseau, and Portsmouth, leaving about 1,000 residents homeless. Ultimately, a fisherman was confirmed dead due to rough sea conditions. Property damage from Luis alone was estimated at $47 million, while the combined effects of Luis, Iris, and Hurricane Marilyn, which struck ten days later, totaled $184 million.

Puerto Rico
Two deaths were additionally reported on the island as a consequence of rushing to prepare for the arrival of the storm.

Bermuda
 
Offshore, the storm produced waves approaching  in height. In total, little to no damage was reported on the island.

Eastern United States and offshore
Rough seas from the storm affected the East Coast of the United States, resulting in some beach erosion and damage to two waterfront structures on Fire Island. High waves, in combination with high tide, caused significant beach erosion and coastal flooding. On September 7, rip currents produced by Luis caused the death of one person near Corncake Inlet, North Carolina. In nearby Hyde, Carteret, and Onslow counties, waves of up to  washed out  of the Triple S Pier in Atlantic Beach, effectively destroying it. Total losses in North Carolina amounted to $1.9 million. In New York, rough seas undermined and destroyed one home, and led to the death of one person who was swimming in the high waves.

Atlantic Canada

Although the ship did not sustain any significant damage, its arrival in New York was delayed considerably.

Throughout eastern Newfoundland, the system dropped  of rain at its landfall as a Category 1. The storm caused minor damage to the large province, with flooding costing an estimated $500,000 in damages. One storm-related death was reported in Canada.

Aftermath and economic impact

Antigua, Barbuda, Dominica and St. Kitts and Nevis
Several bodies of the United Nations contributed financially to the rebuilding of areas affected by Hurricane Luis. The Office for the Coordination of Human Affairs provided $50,000 in emergency funds to the nation of Antigua and Barbuda, as well as the Netherlands Antilles, while the United Nations Development Programme provided an additional $50,000 to Barbados and the Netherlands Antilles. The Children's Fund additionally provided a cash grant of $20,000 to all affected islands, and the Educational, Scientific and Cultural Organization contributed $20,000 to Antigua and Barbuda, $15,000 to Dominica, and $5,000 to St. Kitts and Nevis for the purposes of rebuilding schools. The Organization of American States, meanwhile, provided an emergency cash grant of $250,000 to Antigua and Barbuda, Dominica, and St. Kitts and Nevis.

The Government of the Bahamas provided $50,000 to affected areas, while the Government of Canada donated $149,253 to the Pan American Health Organization and $44,760 to the impacted region. They were joined by a $150,000 donation from the Government of Japan and $15,873 from the Government of Spain. Antigua and Barbuda received $37,593 from the Government of Australia, $200,000 from the Government of France, and $32,942 from the Government of New Zealand. The Government of Germany provided $52,817 in emergency funds to St. Kitts and Nevis, while the Government of the Netherlands contributed $15.2 million in emergency and recovery funds to the Netherlands Antilles. The Government of Norway provided $50,000 in cash assistance to Antigua and Barbuda and St. Kitts and Nevis.

While most of the support was entirely financial, given in emergency and recovery funds, the European Community Humanitarian Aid Office provided relief goods, such as plastic sheeting, water containers, blankets, and basic medical supplies worth $1.2 million. The Government of Jamaica deployed military recovery teams to affected regions to assist with rehabilitation and cleanup efforts.

Saint Martin
The degree of devastation left by Hurricane Luis on Saint Martin left the island inaccessible by air or sea for two days. The storm left up to 2,000 citizens homeless, and rendered the island largely without electricity, running water, or telephone service. When transportation resumed, tourists scrambled for a charter flight out of Princess Juliana International Airport. Both the Netherlands and France sent soldiers and police officers to their respective sides of the island, but eyewitnesses and residents reported that the authorities did little to intercede in the widespread looting that followed the hurricane.

Aside from high winds and seeds, Saint Martin was affected by a substantial difference in wind speed forecasts measured at the sea-level airport, and those measured in homes throughout the island hillsides.

1995–2000

After the hurricane, eight hurricanes affected the areas in the northern Leeward Islands the following years: Hurricane Marilyn ten days later after Luis, Hurricane Bertha and Hortense in 1996, Erika in 1997, Georges in 1998, Jose and Lenny in 1999, and Debby in 2000.

Records and retirement

On August 29, Tropical Storm Luis marked the earliest date on which the twelfth named storm of the season formed, surpassing the previous record set by Tropical Storm Twelve on August 31, 1933. This record has since been broken by Hurricane Laura, which intensified into a tropical storm on August 20, 2020.

It was also one of the most intense extratropical cyclones by wind speed. This would not occur again until Hurricane Fiona in 2022.

On September 11, a  wave struck an ocean liner as a result of Luis.

Since 1950, there have been very few Atlantic hurricanes that have had an Accumulated cyclone energy (ACE) index of over 50. By spending nearly fourteen days as a named storm, including seven consecutive days as a major hurricane, Luis achieved an ACE value of 53.9, the highest since Hurricane Inez in 1966. It retained this record until 2003, when Hurricane Isabel recorded an ACE of 63.3.

Due to the severe damage and loss of life caused by the storm in the Leeward Islands, the name "Luis" was retired in the spring of 1996, ensuring that it will never be used for another Atlantic hurricane. It was subsequently replaced with "Lorenzo" in the 2001 Atlantic hurricane season. Luis was the first Atlantic hurricane name beginning with "L" to have its name retired, and the first hurricane to be retired since Hurricane Andrew in 1992.

See also

 List of Atlantic hurricanes
 List of Bermuda hurricanes
 List of Canada hurricanes
 List of Category 4 Atlantic hurricanes
 Hurricane Hortense (1996)
 Hurricane Earl (2010)
 Hurricane Igor (2010)
 Hurricane Jose (2017)

References

External links
 
 Canadian Hurricane Center

Luis
Luis
Luis
Luis
Luis
Natural disasters in the Leeward Islands
Luis
Luis
Luis
Luis
Luis
Luis
Luis
Luis
Luis
Luis
Luis
Luis
Luis
Luis
Luis
Luis
1995 in the Caribbean
1995 in Antigua and Barbuda
1995 in Guadeloupe
1995 in the Collectivity of Saint Martin
1995 in Canada
1995 meteorology
1995 natural disasters
Luis
Luis
Luis
1995 natural disasters in the United States